Carll House can refer to:

in the United States
(by state then city)
 Carll House (Dix Hills, New York), listed on the National Register of Historic Places (NRHP)
 Carll House (Huntington, New York), NRHP-listed
 Ezra Carll Homestead, Huntington Station, New York, NRHP-listed	
 Marion Carll Farm, Commack, New York, NRHP-listed